Y Es Fácil (And It's Easy) is the title of a studio album recorded by Dominican Republic merengue group Los Hermanos Rosario released on April 22, 1997.

Track listing
This information adapted from Allmusic.

Chart performance

Certification

See also
List of number-one Billboard Tropical Albums from the 1990s

References

1997 albums
Los Hermanos Rosario albums